"Fetal Position" is the seventeenth episode of the third season of House and the sixty-third episode overall.

Plot
Pregnant photographer Emma Sloan (Anne Ramsay) arrives at a photo shoot for singer Tyson Ritter of The All-American Rejects, but she quickly realizes there is something wrong when she cannot read the writing on a chalk board on the set. She quickly checks if her smile is crooked, which it is; whether she can hold her arms straight, which she cannot; and whether her speech is slurred, which it is. Realizing what is happening, she tells the stunned people watching her that she is having a stroke before collapsing.

House comes in to visit Emma, who is checked in at the hospital. She reveals that she learned the way to self-diagnose a stroke from her baby's gay father, which interests House. He runs some tests and determines her kidneys have shut down, and resolves to find the underlying cause of the stroke. Emma is interested in taking photos of House, and the staff is interested in House's photo. House has the staff run tests to determine if she has a blood clot in her heart, while he discusses his vacation plans. Cameron wonders why House did not say anything about seeing her and Chase together. They confirm House's diagnoses and prepare to put in a balloon to clear the clot.

Cameron finds House relaxing in a hyperbaric chamber in an attempt to build up his tolerance for high altitude (by reducing the pressure in the chamber instead of the usual increase, effectively making it into a hypobaric chamber), for his upcoming vacation. Cameron confronts him about telling Cuddy about her and Chase. He ducks the matter while Cuddy tells Emma about the treatment they have planned to relieve the pressure on the fetus's urinary bladder. Cuddy then finds House in her office where he questions her diagnosis of urinary bladder blockage, warning the first two tests will be inconclusive. He suggests that Cuddy is sympathizing with Emma as they are both older women having a baby through artificial insemination. Cuddy decides to hand the case back to House.

The third test proves positive and Chase gives the results to Emma, who is thankful things will turn out okay. Emma notices that Chase is in love with Cameron when he looks at a picture that Emma took of Cameron that makes him smile, and Emma takes a picture of Chase. The doctors prepare to treat the fetus but discover that Emma is jaundiced and her liver is shutting down. House believes the fetus "lied" and the urinary tract obstruction is just a sign of something else. With time running out, House suggests there is only one sure cure: to abort the fetus at 21 weeks. House breaks the news to Emma and she wants to wait two weeks until the fetus is viable, but House warns she will not last two days. She refuses to have an abortion and demands House fix it so they can both live.

House goes to Cuddy who refuses to go to Emma. It's back to a differential diagnosis with Cuddy running the board. Cuddy suggests that they go through the veins in Emma's neck to get to her liver. House mentions Cameron and Chase are dating, much to Foreman's surprise. Cuddy suggests that an unenthusiastic House go on vacation. Chase and Foreman go ahead with the procedure, but the fetus's heart rate drops and Emma goes into pre-term labor. They manage to stop the contractions, but warn they'll have to remove the fetus. Cuddy insists on finding the problem and suggests they have to check the undeveloped lungs. Cuddy suggests they use steroids to increase the lung growth, yet the staff refuses. Cuddy goes off to do it and Emma has another seizure. Wilson goes in to suggest it's time to terminate and Cuddy tells him to either help her or get out.

Later, a concerned Cuddy goes to Wilson and admits that everyone was right all along and Emma's lungs are shutting down. She asks him what House would do if he was in her position, and Cuddy concludes that Emma does not need her lungs because she's on a respirator anyway, so she decides to put the fetus back on steroids. Cuddy goes to House's apartment while he is packing up for his vacation and he agrees to look at the tests now that the fetus's lungs have expanded. They go back to the hospital and try to figure out a way to examine the lungs more thoroughly. They finally decide to do exploratory surgery and explain things to Emma. She agrees and they take her into surgery where House and Cuddy assist the operation.

During the operation, the fetus's hand emerges weakly and grasps House's index finger. House, in response, pauses for a moment, reacting by touching the tiny hand with his thumb. House stares at the phenomenon in awe, but Cuddy reminds him to proceed, and he snaps back to reality. They find lesions in the fetus's lungs but Emma goes into ventricular fibrillation.  House prepares to cut the umbilical cord but Cuddy insists on applying the paddles until Emma is revived, once threatening to electrocute House. Cuddy succeeds, allowing Emma and her son to live.

House informs Emma that the baby is now fine and Emma notes that he now calls the child a "baby" instead of a "fetus" before thanking him. House tells her to thank Cuddy rather than him because he would have "killed the kid." Chase meets with Cameron who notices a photo that Emma took of him, one that shows him "glowing," from earlier when he was looking at a picture of Cameron. Chase refrains from telling this, and when asked by Cameron, simply replies, "I always glow." Cuddy gives House a ticket for a vacation to Vancouver Island saying that it's nice to feel like him by being right, while House counters stating that his solution (abortion) would solve the case ten times out of ten, while Cuddy's solution just worked in one out of one hundred cases, saying that she just got lucky. Cuddy is fine with her decision and tells him to go get happy. House goes home and rips up the ticket, then takes the phone off the hook and settles down for a night of television and Vicodin. He is deep in thought as he stares at his finger where the fetus touched him. In a flash-forward, Emma is seen hanging up photos of Cuddy and House's staff though no pictures of House himself are shown. She lifts up her baby son, smiling and mouths "Greg."

Music
"Are You Alright" by Lucinda Williams.

References

External links
FOX.com - House official site

House (season 3) episodes
2007 American television episodes
Television episodes about abortion
Television episodes directed by Matt Shakman

fr:L'Enfant miroir